James Kabarebe (born 1959) is a Rwandan military officer who has served as a Senior Presidential Adviser on security matters in the government of Rwanda, since 19 October 2018.

Kabarebe was a key figure in both the First Congo War and the Second Congo War as a commanding officer. Like many officers from both sides of those wars he is accused of leading numerous atrocities against civilians.

From 10 April 2010 until 18 October 2018, he was the Rwandan Minister of Defence. He served as a Rwandan Patriotic Army Commander and was an Alliance of Democratic Forces for the Liberation of Congo strategist. In his role of Minister of Defence he was accused of being the de facto leader of the March 23 Movement, a militia in the eastern Democratic Republic of Congo also accused of numerous atrocities against civilians during the Kivu conflict.

Early life and education
James Kabarabe was born in 1959. Raised in Ibanda-Kazo area of western Uganda, he had his early primary education at Kyamate Primary School in western Uganda and attended O-level secondary education at Kabalega Secondary School in Masindi, Bunyoro Western Uganda. He proceeded for A level education at St. Henry's College Kitovu in 1979. He later attended Makerere University, where he received a Bachelor of Arts degree in Economics and Political Science. He was commissioned in 1989.

Rwandan Patriotic Army
James Kabarebe was the private secretary and aide-de-camp (ADC) of Maj. Gen. Paul Kagame. During the Rwandan Civil War, he became Commander of the High Command Unit at Mulindi. Later, this unit became the Republican Guard under Kagame's leadership.

According to reports leaked from the International Criminal Tribunal for Rwanda to reporter and author Judi Rever, Kabarebe presided over the massacre of Hutu civilians in Byumba, north of Kigali, in late April 1994. He arrived at the Byumba stadium and massacre site, "talked with his military colleagues," and "after Kabarebe left, a Lieutenant Masumbuko gave the order to 'open fire on the refugess'", Rever reports in her 2018 book, In Praise of Blood. According to Rever, "Kabarebe's presence inside the stadium has been independently confirmed by several sources interviewed by the tribunal and by me."

First Congo War
During the First Congo War, Kabarebe was the commanding officer of a Rwandan-led army that crossed into Zaire (now the Democratic Republic of the Congo). The aim of the army was to defeat the ex-FAR and Interahamwe, Hutu militia groups that had committed the Genocide against the Tutsi and were engaged in cross-border attacks on Rwanda, destroy the refugee camps that the militia groups and Hutu civilians were living in, and overthrow Zairian President Mobutu Sese Seko.

As chief military strategist in Laurent-Désiré Kabila's rebel Alliance of Democratic Forces for the Liberation of Congo (ADFL), Kabarebe helped engineer the capture of Kinshasa, the capital of the Democratic Republic of the Congo, on May 17, 1997, and the defeat of Mobutu Sese Seko.

At the end of this mission, he was appointed Chief of Staff of the Congolese Army by Kabila. However, relations between Rwanda and Kabila soon deteriorated in circumstances that would eventually lead to the Second Congo War. Fearing a coup d'état, around 27 July 1998, Kabila dismissed Kabarebe from his post. Kabila then appointed General Célestin Kifwa, a Congolese who had previously served in Angola.

Second Congo War
In his time as chief of staff, the 10th division, stationed in eastern Congo, began adding more Banyamulenge, Banyarwanda and ex-FAR troops who tended to oppose Kabila. Following his dismissal as Chief of Staff in July 1998, Kabarebe and Ugandan and Congolese allies began planning an attack on western Congo, intended to quickly topple the Kabila regime. On August 4, he led an airborne assault on Kitona Air Field airlifting with him around 3,000 RPA and UPDF soldiers.

His troops advanced quickly, taking major ports and infrastructure in eastern Congo in a matter of days. In their march the coalition is alleged to have raped and murdered civilians and pillaged banks. In an effort to take Kinshasa the coalition cutoff the power to the city causing according to the UN "the death of an unknown number of civilians, particularly children and hospital patients."

By August 22 he had reached Kinshasa, but Zimbabwean, Namibian, and Angolan intervention prevented his troops from taking and deposing Kabila. He was forced to withdraw to Angola until final evacuation in December 1998. During the retreat of the coalition forces, the Angolan Armed Forces are alleged to have carried out similar atrocities as the coalition did on its march towards Kinshasa.

Rwandan Defence Forces

In October 2002, president Paul Kagame appointed James Kabarebe to the position of Chief of Defence Staff of the Rwandan Defence Forces (formerly Rwandan Patriotic Army).

Accusations
Kabarebe is one of ten Rwandan officials accused in 2006 by Jean-Louis Bruguière, a French judge, of having taken part in the shooting down of the plane of then-president Juvenal Habyarimana. Kabarebe and other senior official have denied these claims. In February, 2008, a Spanish judge, Fernando Andreu, issued arrest warrants against 40 Rwandan officers including Kabarebe. The warrant specifies his role in "the mass killing of Rwandan refugees and the Congolese civilian population. The found evidence of criminal activity against President Kagame as well but could not indict him due to his immunity as a head of state. Rwanda does not have an extradition treaty with Spain.

In 2012, a report from a United Nations Security Council group of experts accused Kabarebe and other Rwandan officials of being the de facto leaders of the M23 militia. M23 is accused of carrying out killings, rapes and other atrocities in the eastern Democratic Republic of Congo. Kabarebe and Rwanda deny the charges.

See also
Rwandan Defence Forces
Rwandan Patriotic Army
First Congo War
Second Congo War
Cabinet of Rwanda

References

External links
 Aftican Studies Quarterly gives the exact dates of Kabarebe's appointment in the ADFL.
 Christian Science Monitor on Kabarebe's relationship with Laurent Kabila.

1959 births
Living people
Tutsi people
Rwandan generals
Makerere University alumni
21st-century Rwandan politicians
Defence ministers of Rwanda
Democratic Republic of the Congo military personnel
Ugandan military personnel
21st-century Democratic Republic of the Congo people